Sweden competed at the 1960 Summer Olympics in Rome, Italy. 134 competitors, 115 men and 19 women, took part in 100 events in 15 sports.

Medalists

Athletics

Boxing

Canoeing

Cycling

Four cyclists, all male, represented Sweden in 1960.

Individual road race
 Gunnar Göransson
 Osvald Johansson
 Owe Adamson
 Gösta Pettersson

Team time trial
 Owe Adamson
 Gunnar Göransson
 Osvald Johansson
 Gösta Pettersson

Diving

Equestrian

Fencing

Seven fencers, six men and one woman, represented Sweden in 1960.

Men's foil
 Hans Lagerwall
 Orvar Lindwall
 Göran Abrahamsson

Men's épée
 Berndt-Otto Rehbinder
 Göran Abrahamsson
 Hans Lagerwall

Men's team épée
 Hans Lagerwall, Göran Abrahamsson, Ulf Ling-Vannérus, Berndt-Otto Rehbinder, Carl-Wilhelm Engdahl, Orvar Lindwall

Women's foil
 Christina Lagerwall

Gymnastics

Modern pentathlon

Three male pentathletes represented Sweden in 1960.

Individual
 Per-Erik Ritzén
 Sture Ericson
 Björn Thofelt

Team
 Per-Erik Ritzén
 Sture Ericson
 Björn Thofelt

Rowing

Sweden had 12 male rowers participate in four out of seven rowing events in 1960.

 Men's coxless pair
 Gösta Eriksson
 Lennart Hansson

 Men's coxed pair
 Gösta Eriksson
 Lennart Hansson
 Owe Lostad (cox)

 Men's coxed four
 Rune Andersson
 Lars-Eric Gustafsson
 Ulf Gustafsson
 Kjell Hansson
 Owe Lostad (cox)

 Men's eight
 Rune Andersson
 Bengt-Åke Bengtsson
 Åke Berntsson
 Lars-Eric Gustafsson
 Ulf Gustafsson
 Kjell Hansson
 Per Hedenberg
 Ralph Hurtig
 Owe Lostad (cox)
 Sture Baatz (round one)

Sailing

Shooting

Nine shooters represented Sweden in 1960.

25 m pistol
 Jan Wallén
 Stig Berntsson

50 m pistol
 Torsten Ullman
 Leif Larsson

300 m rifle, three positions
 Anders Kvissberg
 Kurt Johansson

50 m rifle, three positions
 Anders Kvissberg
 Walther Fröstell

50 m rifle, prone
 Anders Kvissberg
 Kurt Johansson

Trap
 Rune Andersson
 Carl Beck-Friis

Swimming

Weightlifting

Wrestling

References

Nations at the 1960 Summer Olympics
1960
1960 in Swedish sport